The Men's sprint competition at the 2019 UCI Track Cycling World Championships was held on 2 and 3 March 2019.

Results

Qualifying
The qualifying was started on 2 March at 12:30. The top four riders advanced directly to the 1/8 finals; places 5 to 28 advanced to the 1/16 finals.

1/16 finals
The 1/16 finals were started on 2 March at 13:39. Heat winners advanced to the 1/8 finals.

1/8 finals
The 1/8 finals were started on 2 March at 15:14. Heat winners advanced to the quarterfinals.

Quarterfinals
The quarterfinals were started on 2 March at 17:22. Matches were extended to a best-of-three format hereon; winners proceeded to the semifinals.

Semifinals
The semifinals were started on 3 March at 12:00. Winners proceeded to the final.

Finals
The finals were started on 3 March at 14:37.

References

Men's sprint
2019